Clodoaldo de Oliveira (born March 19, 1974, in Ernestina, Rio Grande do Sul), known as Ernestina or Oliveira, is a Brazilian footballer.

Biography
Before he left for Hong Kong in August 2004, he played for Esportivo.

He has played as a midfielder for the Hong Kong First Division club Happy Valley in the 2005-06 season.

The free scoring left winger became the top scorer in all competition in his debut season in Hong Kong First Division in 2004-05.  But he was denied the chance to compete for the Footballer of the Year award when his club failed to nominate him.  The following season saw him continued his scoring form and help his team to the league title, even though for the large part he had been playing out of position.

Honours
With Happy Valley:
Hong Kong First Division League: 2005-06
Personal Hononrs:
Hong Kong First Division League Top Scorer: 2004-05, 2005–06
Hong Kong League Cup Top Scorer: 2004-05
Hong Kong FA Cup Top Scorer: 2004-05

Career statistics

Club career
As of January 17, 2007

Trivia
Ernestina scored four hat tricks for Happy Valley in the 2004-05 season.
On June 4, 2005, Ernestina helped Kitchee to beat Italian giants Juventus F.C. in an exhibition match.

References

External links
Clodoaldo de Oliveira at HKFA

CBF  

1974 births
Living people
Brazilian footballers
Brazilian expatriate footballers
Brazilian expatriate sportspeople in Hong Kong
Association football midfielders
Avaí FC players
Expatriate footballers in Hong Kong
Happy Valley AA players
Hong Kong First Division League players